The 2003 Men's European Volleyball Championship was the 23rd edition of the event, organized by Europe's governing volleyball body, the Confédération Européenne de Volleyball. It was hosted in Berlin, Germany from September 5 to September 14, 2003.

Qualification

The first five from the 2001 edition of the Men's European Volleyball Championship — Serbia & Montenegro, Italy, Czech Republic, Russia, and Poland — plus hosts Germany were automatically qualified. The four group winners qualified, and the two best numbers two.

Teams

Group A

Group B

Preliminary round

Group A

Group B

Final round

Final ranking

Awards

Most Valuable Player
 

Best Scorer
 

Best Spiker
 

Best Blocker
 
Best Server
 

Best Receiver
 

Best Setter
 

Best Digger

References
 CEV Results
 Results
 Czech Results

Men's European Volleyball Championships
E
Volleyball Championship
V
Volleyball
2003 in Berlin